This is a list of flag bearers who have represented Egypt at the Olympics.

Flag bearers carry the national flag of their country at the opening ceremony of the Olympic Games.

Flagbearers

See also
Egypt at the Olympics

References

Egypt at the Olympics
Egypt
Olympic flagbearers